Klainer SS ('Little SS') was a children's organization in the Russian Empire, tied to the Zionist Socialist Workers Party (colloquially known by its Russian initials 'SS'). Klainer SS was founded in Warsaw in late 1905, in the back-drop of the Russian revolution of 1905.

References

Sports organizations established in 1906
Labor Zionism
Youth wings of political parties in Russia
1906 establishments in the Russian Empire
Zionist youth movements